Jang Hun may refer to:
 Jang Hoon (born 1975), South Korean film director
 Isao Harimoto (born 1940), born Jang Hun, Korean baseball player living in Japan